Billboard publishes annual lists of songs based on chart performance over the course of a year based on Nielsen Broadcast Data Systems and SoundScan information. For 2012, the list for the top 100 Billboard Hot 100 Year-End songs was published on December 14, calculated with data from December 3, 2011 to November 24, 2012. At the number-one position was Gotye's "Somebody That I Used to Know" featuring Kimbra, which stayed atop the Hot 100 for eight consecutive weeks.

See also
 2012 in American music
 List of Billboard Hot 100 number-one singles of 2012
 List of Billboard Hot 100 top-ten singles in 2012

References

United States Hot 100 Year-End
Billboard charts